Justice Nishar Ahemad Kureshi (born 7 March 1960) is an Indian judge. He is former Chief Justice of Rajasthan High Court and former Chief Justice of Tripura High Court. He is former Judge of Bombay High Court and Gujarat High Court, of which he has also served as an Acting Chief Justice.

Career 
Justice Kureshi passed B.Sc. (Mathematics) in 1980 and LL.B. in 1983. He joined the Bar and started his legal practice in the Gujarat High Court from July 1983. He was appointed the Additional Central Government Standing Counsel from March 1992 to March 1998 and the Additional Counsel for the Income-tax Department in January 2000 where he represented Income Tax Department in the Gujarat High Court up to December 2001. He was appointed an additional judge of the Gujarat High Court on 7 March 2004 and became a permanent judge on 12 August 2005. 

Kureshi was appointed Acting Chief Justice of the High Court of Gujarat on 2 November 2018. He was transferred to the Bombay High Court on 14 November 2018. He took oath as the Chief Justice of Tripura High Court on 16 November 2019.

On 9 October 2021, he was appointed the Chief Justice of the Rajasthan High Court and took oath on 12 October 2021.

References

1960 births
Living people
Chief Justices of the Rajasthan High Court
Chief Justices of the Tripura High Court
Judges of the Gujarat High Court
Judges of the Bombay High Court